Methyl cyanoacrylate (MCA) (also sometimes referred to as α-cyanoacrylate or alpha-cyanoacrylate) is an organic compound that contains several functional groups: a methyl ester, a nitrile, and an alkene. It is a colorless liquid with low viscosity. Its chief use is as the main component of cyanoacrylate glues. It can be encountered under many trade names. Methyl cyanoacrylate is less commonly encountered than ethyl cyanoacrylate.

It is soluble in acetone, methyl ethyl ketone, nitromethane, and dichloromethane.  MCA polymerizes rapidly in presence of moisture.

Safety
Heating the polymer causes depolymerization of the cured MCA, producing gaseous products which are a strong irritant to the lungs and eyes.
With regards to occupational exposure to MCA, the National Institute for Occupational Safety and Health recommends workers do not exceed exposures over 2 ppm (8 mg/m3) over an eight-hour workshift, or over 4ppm (16 mg/m3) over a short-term exposure.

References

Methyl esters
Cyanoacrylate esters
Monomers
Lachrymatory agents